The Midlands women's field hockey team is an amateur sports team based in New Zealand. The team competes annually in the Ford National Hockey League (NHL).

In the past 17 editions of the tournament, Midlands have only won the championship once, in 2013.

Team roster
The following is the Midlands team roster for the 2017 Ford NHL:

Head coach: Reiner Vellinga

Sally Rutherford (GK)
Anita Hope (GK)
Frances Davies
Abbie Johnston
Kate Kernaghan
Shiloh Gloyn
Tarryn Davey
Ellie McCleery
Megan Hull
Gemma McCaw
Alex Lukin
Samantha Charlton (C)
Kate Savory
Kim Tanner
Amy Robinson
Rose Keddell
Natasha FitzSimons
Julia Ebert

References

Women's field hockey teams in New Zealand
2000 establishments in New Zealand